Archineura is a genus of broad-winged damselflies in the family Calopterygidae. There are at least three described species in Archineura.

Species
These three species belong to the genus Archineura:
 Archineura hetaerinoides (Fraser, 1933)
 Archineura incarnata (Karsch, 1891)
 Archineura maxima (Martin, 1904)

References

Further reading

 
 
 

Calopterygidae
Articles created by Qbugbot